Wondaland Presents: The Eephus is the second extended play (EP) by the artists signed to Wondaland Records. It was released on August 14, 2015, by Epic Records and Sony Music. The EP includes five tracks, featuring Janelle Monáe, Jidenna, Roman GianArthur, Deep Cotton and St. Beauty. The sixth track is the remix to Jidenna's "Classic Man" featuring Kendrick Lamar, and it is included with the EP on iTunes.

Background
In February 2015, Janelle Monáe announced that she had signed her Wondaland Records label to a partnership deal with Epic Records. Soon after, she announced that she and her collective (Jidenna, St. Beauty, Roman GianArthur and Deep Cotton) would be releasing a 5-track EP titled The Eephus, which is a term used in baseball to an unusual type of pitch. Epic CEO and chairman L.A. Reid said of Monáe and her collective, "The collective talent of the Wondaland artists is awe-inspiring," and also that, "I haven't personally witnessed a collective that sounds and looks this special in quite a while. I've been a longtime supporter and friend of Janelle and it is an honor to now work with her as a visionary businesswoman who brings an all-star group of talented performers to the table". Two singles have been released from the EP Jidenna's "Classic Man" and Monáe's "Yoga", which also features Jidenna.

Track listing

Charts

References

2015 EPs
Epic Records EPs
Sony Music EPs
Collaborative albums
Janelle Monáe albums
Psychedelic music EPs
Pop music EPs
Hip hop EPs
Contemporary R&B EPs